This is a list of diplomatic missions of Montenegro, excluding honorary consulates. Montenegro is building its diplomatic network. As this information is subject to change, full list can always be obtained from the website of Montenegrin Ministry of Foreign Affairs and European Integration. 

On November 30, 2006, the Government has adopted the Memorandum of Agreement between Montenegro and the Republic of Serbia on Consular Protection and Services to the Citizens of Montenegro. By this agreement, Serbia, through its network of diplomatic and consular missions, provides consular services to the Montenegrin citizens on the territory of states in which Montenegro has no missions of its own. Details of the Serbian missions abroad are listed on the Serbian MFA website.

Americas

 Buenos Aires (Embassy)
 
Washington, D.C. (Embassy)
New York (Consulate-General)

Asia

 Baku (Embassy)

 Beijing (Embassy)

Ankara (Embassy)
Istanbul (Consulate-General)

Abu-Dhabi (Embassy)

Europe

Tirana (Embassy)

 Vienna (Embassy)

 Brussels (Embassy)

 Sarajevo (Embassy)

 Sofia (Embassy)

 Zagreb (Embassy)
 
Paris (Embassy)

 Berlin (Embassy)
 Frankfurt (Consulate-General)

 Athens (Embassy)
 
Rome (Embassy)

 Budapest (Embassy)
 
 Rome (Embassy)

 Pristina (Embassy)

 Skopje (Embassy)

 Warsaw (Embassy)

 Bucharest (Embassy)

 Moscow (Embassy)

 Belgrade (Embassy)
 Sremski Karlovci (Consulate-General)

 Ljubljana (Embassy)

 Madrid (Embassy)
 
Bern (Embassy)
 
Kyiv (Embassy)
 
London (Embassy)

International Organisations

NATO
Brussels
OSCE
Vienna
European Union
Brussels
Council of Europe
Strasbourg
United Nations 
New York City
United Nations
Geneva
UNESCO
Paris

See also 
Foreign relations of Montenegro
List of Ambassadors from Montenegro

External links
The Ministry of Foreign Affairs and European Integration of Montenegro

Notes

References

Montenegro
Diplomatic missions